Stephen Bunting (born 27 December 1984) is an Irish cricketer. He made his List A debut for Northern Knights in the 2018 Inter-Provincial Cup on 16 July 2018.

References

External links
 

1984 births
Living people
Irish cricketers
Northern Knights cricketers
Place of birth missing (living people)